Viliame Hekmatzadah  "Bill" Kikau (born 5 April 1995) is a Fijian professional rugby league footballer who plays as a  forward for the Canterbury-Bankstown Bulldogs in the NRL, and Fiji at international level.  

He previously played for the Penrith Panthers in the National Rugby League, and is a dual NRL premiership winning player of 2021 and 2022.

Background
Kikau was born in Nausori, Fiji, and grew up in the small island of Bau.

Kikau played rugby union in his youth and later earned placements at Queen Victoria School and Marist Brothers High School in Suva, where he played for their rugby union team and represented the Fiji Secondary Schools side against the Australian Schoolboys. In 2013, Kikau who never played rugby league was scouted by North Queensland recruiter Adrian Thomson in a schoolboy match and was one of three Fijian players who spent six weeks in Townsville.

Kikau was the only player to sign with the club and joined their Holden Cup team for the 2014 season. At the time Kikau was also being scouted by a number of French rugby union clubs

Early career

2014
In 2014, Kikau's first season of rugby league, he played 21 games for North Queensland's Holden Cup team, scoring 11 tries. A centre in his rugby union days, Kikau switched to prop after joining North Queensland.

2015
In 2015, Kikau played in a pre-season trial game with North Queensland's first grade team. He scored a try in the sides 24–12 victory over the Townsville Blackhawks.

On 2 May 2015, Kikau made his international debut for Fiji against Papua New Guinea in the Melanesian Cup match, playing off the interchange bench in the 22–10 win at Robina Stadium. On 10 June 2015, Kikau signed a two-year contract with the Penrith Panthers. On 14 September 2015, Kikau was named at prop in the 2015 NYC Team of the Year, finishing his Holden Cup career with the North Queensland club with 32 tries from 42 matches.

2016
Kikau spent 2016 playing in Penrith's NSW Cup team. On 8 October 2016, Kikau played for Fiji against Samoa, starting at second-row in the 20–18 victory in Apia, Samoa.

Playing career

2017
In Round 2, Kikau made his NRL debut for the Penrith Panthers against the Wests Tigers, playing off the interchange bench and scoring a try in the 36–2 win at Campbelltown Stadium. On 15 April, he re-signed with the Penrith Panthers to the end of the 2019 NRL season.

On 6 May, Kikau played for Fiji against Tonga, starting at second-row and scoring a try in the 26–24 loss at Campbelltown Stadium. Kikau would play most of the year playing in Penrith's NSW cup team where they won the NSW Intrust Super premiership against the Wyong Roos 20–12. A week later on 1 October, Kikau played in the NRL State Championship match against QLD Cup winners the Papua New Guinea Hunters starting at second-row and scoring a try in the 42–18 boilover win. Kikau finished his debut year in the NRL with 9 matches and 1 try for the Panthers in the NRL. On 7 October, he was named in the 24-man squad for Fiji for the 2017 Rugby League World Cup. Kikau had an outstanding tournament for Fiji playing in all of their 5 matches and scoring 3 tries and was rewarded with him being named in the World Cup Team of the Tournament.

2018
After his impressive World Cup campaign, Kikau would cement a permanent place in Penrith's top 17.
He made 25 appearances in the 2018 NRL season as the club finished 5th and reached the elimination final against Cronulla-Sutherland before losing 21–20.

2019
In round 23 of the 2019 NRL season, Kikau played his 50th NRL game for Penrith in their 24–10 defeat by the North Queensland Cowboys at 1300Smiles stadium.  Kikau made a total of 18 appearances for Penrith in the 2019 NRL season as the club finished 10th on the table and missed out on the finals for the first time since 2015.

2020
Kikau played 19 games for Penrith in the 2020 NRL season as the club won the Minor Premiership.  Kikau played in the 2020 NRL Grand Final for Penrith in which they lost 26-20 against Melbourne.

2021
In round 2 of the 2021 NRL season, he scored two tries in a 28-0 victory over Canterbury-Bankstown.

In round 4 of the 2021 NRL season, he scored two tries in a 46-6 victory over Manly-Warringah at Brookvale Oval.

On 27 September, Kikau was named Dally M Second Rower of the year alongside Parramatta's Isaiah Papali'i.

Kikau played a total of 27 games for Penrith in the 2021 NRL season including the club's 2021 NRL Grand Final victory over South Sydney.  Kikau scored a second half try in the final but was disallowed on review due to the pass from Nathan Cleary being ruled forward.

Following Penrith's grand final victory, an intoxicated Kikau went on Instagram and mocked South Sydney by singing their club song.  Penrith teammate Tyrone May then appeared on the video and said "I don’t give a f***. F*** every motherf***er, n***er".

In November, an image of Kikau was leaked from a security camera within Canterbury Leagues Club showing Kikau posting in a Canterbury shirt along with head coach Trent Barrett and head of football Phil Gould.  Kikau then took to social media and explained the situation saying "Today photos were taken of me wearing another club’s colours," Kikau wrote. 
"Me and my manager were told the photos wouldn’t become public until the appropriate time.  I am very disappointed that didn’t happen and regret the upset it has caused.  I want the Panthers fans to know I remain fully committed to our club and the team for the upcoming season.  I can’t wait to celebrate our premiership with you".

2022
In round 2 of the 2022 NRL season, Kikau scored two tries for Penrith in a 20-16 victory over St. George Illawarra.
Kikau played 25 games throughout the season for Penrith including the clubs 2022 NRL Grand Final victory over Parramatta.
In the second group stage match of the 2021 Rugby League World Cup, Kikau scored two tries for Fiji in their 60-4 victory over Italy.

2023
In round 1 of the 2023 NRL season, Kikau made his club debut for Canterbury in their 31-6 loss against Manly at Brookvale Oval.

References

External links
Penrith Panthers profile
Panthers profile
North Queensland Cowboys profile
2017 RLWC profile
Fiji profile

1995 births
Fijian rugby league players
Fiji national rugby league team players
Penrith Panthers players
Canterbury-Bankstown Bulldogs players
Rugby league props
Fijian expatriates in Australia
Expatriate rugby league players in Australia
People from Nausori
I-Taukei Fijian people
People educated at Marist Brothers High School, Fiji
Living people